Alain Cousin (born 8 April 1947) is a member of the National Assembly of France.  He represents the Manche department,  and is a member of the Union for a Popular Movement.

References

1947 births
Living people
People from Manche
Rally for the Republic politicians
Union for a Popular Movement politicians
Deputies of the 12th National Assembly of the French Fifth Republic
Deputies of the 13th National Assembly of the French Fifth Republic
Politicians from Normandy